Blanket is a town located in Brown County in west-central Texas, United States. The population was 390 at the 2010 census.

The town takes its name from nearby Blanket Creek.

Geography

Blanket is located in eastern Brown County at  (31.826469, –98.788172). U.S. Routes 67 and 377 pass along the southeast edge of the town, leading southwest  to Brownwood, the county seat, and northeast  to Comanche.

Demographics

As of the census of 2000, 402 people, 170 households, and 113 families resided in the town. The population density was 699.5 people per square mile (272.3/km). The 189 housing units averaged 328.9 per square mile (128.0/km). The racial makeup of the town was 92.54% White, 1.00% African American, 1.00% Native American, 3.73% from other races, and 1.74% from two or more races. Hispanics or Latinos of any race were 9.20% of the population.

Of the 170 households, 31.2% had children under the age of 18 living with them, 54.1% were married couples living together, 10.0% had a female householder with no husband present, and 33.5% were not families. About 31.2% of all households were made up of individuals, and 14.1% had someone living alone who was 65 years of age or older. The average household size was 2.36 and the average family size was 2.97.

In the town, the population was distributed as 28.4% under the age of 18, 4.7% from 18 to 24, 26.6% from 25 to 44, 25.9% from 45 to 64, and 14.4% who were 65 years of age or older. The median age was 39 years. For every 100 females, there were 103.0 males. For every 100 females age 18 and over, there were 92.0 males.

The median income for a household in the town was $34,375, and for a family was $42,222. Males had a median income of $34,063 versus $16,667 for females. The per capita income for the town was $16,611. About 15.4% of families and 17.8% of the population were below the poverty line, including 21.9% of those under age 18 and 31.7% of those age 65 or over.

Education
Blanket is served by the Blanket Independent School District.

Photo gallery

Climate
The climate in this area is characterized by hot, humid summers and generally mild to cool winters.  According to the Köppen climate classification, Blanket has a humid subtropical climate, Cfa on climate maps.

Six-man football

Six-man football is played in Blanket by Blanket High School and Blanket Junior High School. Six-man football is a variation of American football played with six players on a team, rather than 11. Blanket High's six-man football team broke the 100 points in a game mark when in 2014 they defeated Loraine High 101–99 during a Class 1A Division 2 bidistrict playoff game. Also over the years, Blanket High School has won numerous awards from Six-man Heaven Arts Contest  in areas of film, poetry, web design, photography, and music, all focused om six-man football. Six-man football follows rules and organization laid out by the UIL, governing body of high school sports in Texas.

References

Towns in Brown County, Texas
Towns in Texas